This is a list of notable Presbyterian churches in Pennsylvania, where a church is notable either as a congregation or as a building.  In Pennsylvania, numerous churches are listed on the National Register of Historic Places or are noted on state or local historic registers. This list also includes sites listed by the Presbyterian Historical Society as part of their American Presbyterian/Reformed Historical Sites Registry (APRHS), which also includes sites from related Reformed churches and congregations.

This article also includes related other items, such as various former Presbyterian meetinghouse sites, or cemeteries or parsonages that are NRHP-listed where the corresponding church building is more modern and not NRHP-listed.

References

Further reading

 
Presbyterian churches in Pennsylvania
Chuches, Presbyterian